is a railway station on the Wakasa Railway Wakasa Line in Yazu, Tottori, Japan, operated by the third sector company Wakasa Railway.

Lines
Only local trains stop at this station.

Station layout
The station consists of one ground-level side platform serving a single bi-directional track.  This station building and platform were built in 1929 and were registered as Tangible Cultural Property in 2008.

Adjacent stations

History
Hayabusa Station opened on 20 January 1930.

Passenger statistics
In fiscal 2018, the station was used by an average of 45 passengers daily.

Surrounding area
Japan National Route 482
Yazu Town Hayabusa Elementary School

See also
List of railway stations in Japan

References

External links 

Railway stations in Tottori Prefecture
Railway stations in Japan opened in 1930
Yazu, Tottori
Registered Tangible Cultural Properties